Sir Andrew Searle Hart (1811–1890) was an Anglo-Irish mathematician and Vice-Provost of Trinity College Dublin (TCD).

Early life and background
His grandfather, Lieutenant John Hart, a younger son of the family, was killed in action at the Battle of the Monongahela.

His father took possession of the Glenalla and Carrablagh estates from the Murrays, to whom his wife was related.

He was a descendant of Henry Hart, who came to Ireland with the army of Elizabeth I. Another relation, Sir Eustace Hart, married Lady Mary de Vere, a daughter of John de Vere, 16th Earl of Oxford and a sister of the 17th Earl of Oxford, who is a proposed alternative to the authorship of the works by William Shakespeare.

His mother, Maria Murray Hume, was from the same family as the philosopher David Hume. Sir Andrew's first cousin once removed was James Deacon Hume, the 18th century economist and civil servant. On the Murray side, Hart was a direct descendant of the Murrays of Cockpool and of Sir William Murray, who married Isabel Randolph, a sister of Thomas Randolph, 1st Earl of Moray and a niece of Robert the Bruce.

He was educated at Foyle College and by a private tutor before entering TCD in 1828, where he became the class-fellow and intimate friend of Isaac Butt, with whom he always preserved a warm friendship although they differed in politics. Hart graduated BA 1833, proceeded MA 1839, and LL.B. and LL.D. 1840. He was elected a fellow on 15 June 1835. From 1827 to 1832 he was the Donegall Lecturer in Mathematics at TCD.

Academic career
Hart obtained much reputation as a mathematician, and published useful treatises on hydrostatics and mechanics. Between 1849 and 1861 he contributed valuable papers to the Cambridge and Dublin Mathematical Journal, to the 'Proceedings of the Irish Academy,' and to the Quarterly Journal of Mathematics, chiefly on the subject of geodesic lines and on curves.

Hart also served as Professor of Real and Personal Property in King's Inns, Dublin.

Hart's Theorem
Hart's most important contribution was contained in his paper Extension of Terquem's theorem respecting the circle which bisects three sides of a triangle (1861). Hart wrote this paper after an carrying out an investigation suggested by William Rowan Hamilton in a letter to Hart. In addition, Hart corresponded with George Salmon on the same topic. This paper contains the result which became known as Hart's Theorem, which is a generalisation of Feuerbach's Theorem. Hart's Theorem states:

In Principles of geometry (1925), Henry Baker sums up Hart's Theorem as follows:

Hart was co-opted as a Senior Fellow of TCD on 10 July 1858.

In February 1873, Hart made up part of the delegation sent to London on behalf of TCD to lobby members of parliament to vote against the Irish University Bill

He was elected Vice-Provost of TCD in 1876, and at this time undertook many of the duties of the then provost, Humphrey Lloyd, that ill health had permitted him from carrying out.

Personal life
He married in 1840 Frances, daughter of Sir Henry McDougall, Q.C., of Dublin; she died in 1876. Two sons, George Vaughan Hart (1841-1912), a barrister, and Henry Chichester Hart (1847-1908), a botanist and explorer, of Carrablagh House, Donegal, survived him. The youngest son, William Hume Hart (1852-1887) predeceased Sir Andrew.

Sir Andrew Hart took an active interest in the affairs of the Irish Church, and was for many years a member of the general synod and representative church body.

On 25 January 1886 he was knighted at Dublin Castle by the lord-lieutenant, Lord Carnarvon, "in recognition of his academic rank and attainments."

Photograph

Left to right: Norah Searle Hart (1879-1965), Adelaide (Ada) Hart (1876-197?), George Vaughan (Vaughan) Hart (1877-1928), Hilda Chichester Hart (1882-1967), Tristram Beresford Hart (1884-1963), Ruth Hart (1886-1977), Sir Andrew Searle Hart, Ethel Hart (1875-1964). All the minors shown except Ada were children of George Vaughan Hart. Ada was the daughter of William Hume Hart.

Ancestry

Publications
 'An Elementary Treatise on Mechanics,' 1844; 2nd edit. 1847. 
 'On the Form of Geodesic Lines through the Umbilic of an Ellipsoid, Proceedings of the Royal Irish Academy 4 (1847-1850), 274,' 1849.
 'Geometrical demonstration of some properties of geodesic lines, Cambridge and Dublin Mathematical Journal 4 (1849), 80–84.'
 'On geodesic lines traced on a surface of the second degree, Cambridge and Dublin Mathematical Journal 4 (1849), 192–194.'
 'An Elementary Treatise on Hydrostatics and Hydrodynamics,' 1846; another edit. 1850.
 'An account of some transformations of curves, Cambridge and Dublin Mathematical Journal 8 (1853), 47–50.'
 'On the porism of the in-and-circumscribed triangle, Quarterly Journal of Pure and Applied Mathematics 2 (1858), 143.'
 'Extension of Terquem's theorem respecting the circle which bisects three sides of a triangle, Quarterly Journal of Pure and Applied Mathematics 4 (1861), 260–261.'
 'On Nine-Point Contact of Cubic Curves, The Transactions of the Royal Irish Academy 25, Science (1875), 559–565.'
 'On the Intersections of Plane Curves of the Third Order, The Transactions of the Royal Irish Academy 26, Science (1879), 449–452.'
 'On Twisted Quartics, Hermathena 5 (10) (1884), 164–170.'
 'On the Linear Relations between the Nine Points of Intersection of a System of Plane Cubic Curves, Hermathena 6 (13) (1887), 286–289.'

References

Attribution

1811 births
1890 deaths
Alumni of Trinity College Dublin
19th-century Anglo-Irish people
Donegall Lecturers of Mathematics at Trinity College Dublin
Irish mathematicians